Protodufourea is a genus of sweat bees in the family Halictidae. There are about five described species in Protodufourea.

Species
These five species belong to the genus Protodufourea:
 Protodufourea eickworti Bohart & Griswold, 1997
 Protodufourea koso Bohart & Griswold, 1997
 Protodufourea parca Timberlake, 1955
 Protodufourea wasbaueri Timberlake, 1955
 Protodufourea zavortinki Bohart & Griswold, 1997

References

Further reading

 

Halictidae
Articles created by Qbugbot